Three Tales is the title of multiple works:

Three Tales (anime), the first Japanese anime ever broadcast
Three Tales (Flaubert), a short story collection by Gustave Flaubert
Three Tales (opera), an opera by Steve Reich and Beryl Korot
Three Tales (Wandrei), a short story collection by Howard Wandrei